This is an incomplete list of video games strongly featuring zombies. These games feature creatures inspired by the archetypal flesh-eating zombies seen in horror films, B-movies and literature; such as in the films of George A. Romero. Other variants, such as the faster running zombies, are also included. Particular zombie rationale and depictions vary with the source.

Zombies are common or generic enemies in video games. The ZX Spectrum computer game Zombie Zombie, released in Europe in 1984, is considered to be the first video game focused on zombies. Zombie games became more prevalent after the release of the survival horror game Resident Evil in 1996. This release, coupled with the 1996 light gun shooter The House of the Dead, gave rise to "an international craze" for zombies, in turn impacting zombie films. Resident Evil sold 2.75 million copies within the United States alone, and its success resulted in it becoming a major horror franchise encompassing video games, novelizations, and films. The House of the Dead is also credited with introducing fast running zombies, distinct from Romero's classic slow zombies.

List

References

Video game lists by theme
Video games about zombies